Pillucina is a genus of saltwater clams, marine bivalve molluscs in the subfamily Lucininae of the family Lucinidae.

Species
 Pillucina australis Glover & J. D. Taylor, 2001
 Pillucina copiosa Glover & J. D. Taylor, 2007
 Pillucina hawaiiensis (E. A. Smith, 1885)
 Pillucina maestratii Glover & J. D. Taylor, 2016
 Pillucina mauritiana Glover & J. D. Taylor, 2001
 Pillucina neglecta Habe, 1960
 Pillucina pacifica Glover & J. D. Taylor, 2001
 Pillucina pisidium (Dunker, 1860)
 Pillucina profusa Glover & J. D. Taylor, 2016
 Pillucina symbolica (Iredale, 1930)
Synonyms
 Pillucina angela (Melvill, 1899): synonym of Rugalucina angela (Melvill, 1899)
 Pillucina denticula Glover & J. D. Taylor, 2001: synonym of Pusillolucina denticula (Glover & J. D. Taylor, 2001) (original combination) Pillucina pusilla Glover & J. D. Taylor, 2016: synonym of Pusillolucina pusilla (Glover & J. D. Taylor, 2016) (original combination)
 Pillucina spaldingi (Pilsbry, 1921): synonym of Pillucina hawaiiensis (E. A. Smith, 1885) (junior synonym)
 Pillucina vietnamica Zorina, 1978: synonym of Rugalucina vietnamica'' (Zorina, 1978) (original combination)

References

 Glover, E.A. & Taylor, J.D. (2007). Diversity of chemosymbiotic bivalves on coral reefs: Lucinidae (Mollusca Bivalvia) of New Caledonia and Lifou. Zoosystema. 29(1): 109-181
Lucinidae of the Philippines: highest known diversity and ubiquity of chemosymbiotic bivalves from intertidal to bathyal depths (Mollusca: Bivalvia), in HEROS V., STRONG E. & BOUCHET P. (eds), Tropical Deep-Sea Benthos 29. Mémoires du Muséum national d'Histoire naturelle 208: 65-234
 Taylor J. & Glover E. (2021). Biology, evolution and generic review of the chemosymbiotic bivalve family Lucinidae. London: The Ray Society [Publication 182]. 319 pp.

External links
 Pilsbry, H. A. (1921). Marine mollusks of Hawaii, XIV-XV. Proceedings of The Academy of Natural Sciences of Philadelphia. 72: 360-383
 Iredale, T. (1930). More notes on the marine Mollusca of New South Wales. Records of the Australian Museum. 17(9): 384-407, pls 62-65
 Glover, E.A.; Taylor, J.D. (2001). Systematic revision of Australian and Indo-Pacific Lucinidae (Mollusca: Bivalvia): Pillucina, Wallucina and descriptions of two new genera and four new species. Records of the Australian Museum 53: 263-292.

Lucinidae
Bivalve genera